Gjonaj is an Albanian surname. Notable people with the surname include:

Adriana Gjonaj, Albanian politician
Algert Gjonaj (born 1987), Albanian basketball player
Etilda Gjonaj (born 1981), Albanian politician
Kujtim Gjonaj (born 1946), Albanian screenwriter
Mark Gjonaj, American politician
Salvador Gjonaj (born 1992), Albanian footballer

It is also a geological name:

Gjonaj, Prizren, village in Kosovo

See also
Gjoni

Albanian-language surnames